JWH-047 is a selective cannabinoid ligand that binds to both CB1 and CB2.  It has a bindining affinity of Ki = 0.9 nM for the CB2 subtype, and more than 65 times selectivity over the CB1.

In the United States, all CB1 receptor agonists of the 3-(1-naphthoyl)indole class such as JWH-047 are Schedule I Controlled Substances.

See also
JWH-015
JWH-018
JWH-019
JWH-073

References

Naphthoylindoles
JWH cannabinoids
CB1 receptor agonists
CB2 receptor agonists